Siege of Moscow may refer to:

Siege of Moscow (1238)
Siege of Moscow (1382)
Siege of Moscow (1571)
Siege of Moscow (1606)
Siege of Moscow (1618)

See also
 Battle of Moscow (disambiguation)